Nice Guys is the second single from We Are Scientists' album Barbara. The single was released on 7 June 2010, the week before Barbara and managed to debut at number 17 on the UK Indie Chart.

Release
The track was premiered on Zane Lowe's BBC Radio 1 show on April 29, and made his Hottest Record soon after. The single's artwork features dolls of the band - (L-R) Andy, Keith, and Chris. The dolls were created by Adrian Stone, a fan of the band.

Chart performance
"Nice Guys" debuted on the UK Indie Chart at number 17 on 13 June 2010.

External links
 Official website

References

We Are Scientists songs
2010 singles
2010 songs